Silvia Airik-Priuhka (25 January 1926 Tallinn – 11 February 2014 Stockholm) was an Estonian writer and poetry translator.

In autumn 1944, she escaped via Finland to Sweden.

Works
 Est! Est! Est! Stockholm, 1980. 
 Hammarbyhöjdeni Seppe. Stockholm, 1983.
  Vanaisa hingeke. Tallinn, 1992.
 Ilma nõela pistmata. Tallinn, 1997.
 Ma lillesideme võtsin. Tallinn, 1998.
 Toonela väraval. Tartu, 2004.

References

External links
 Silvia Airik-Priuhka at Estonian Writers' Online Dictionary

1926 births
2014 deaths
Estonian women poets
20th-century Estonian women writers
21st-century Estonian women writers
Estonian translators
Writers from Tallinn
Estonian World War II refugees
Estonian emigrants to Sweden